Jenő Landler (November 23, 1875 – February 25, 1928) was a Hungarian politician and socialist leader.  

Born in to a Jewish family, he studied to be a lawyer and was drawn to the Social Democratic Party through his involvement in the ironworker's trade union movement. However, he kept moving politically to the left and became a Communist. After the Hungarian Revolution of 1919, he became people's commissar of interior affairs in the new communist government. He was also a commander of the Hungarian Red Army fighting the foreign troops of the interventionists. After the fall of the Hungarian Soviet Republic he emigrated to Austria where he continued to be a leader of the exiled Hungarian communist movement. 

Jenő Landler died in 1928 in exile in Cannes. His ashes were brought to Moscow and placed in the Kremlin wall.

References

External links 
 The Great Soviet Encyclopedia (1979)

1875 births
1928 deaths
People from Zala County
Jewish Hungarian politicians
Jewish socialists
Social Democratic Party of Hungary politicians
Hungarian Interior Ministers
Hungarian revolutionaries
Hungarian people of the Hungarian–Romanian War
Burials at the Kremlin Wall Necropolis
Hungarian communists

Hungarian emigrants to Austria
Hungarian emigrants to France